Everaldo Vergne de Assis Barbosa (born September 12, 1975) is a former Brazilian football midfielder who currently serves as a technical director for Club Necaxa.

Everaldo has played for Guarani and Santa Cruz in the Campeonato Brasileiro, before moving to Mexico where he played for Chiapas and Necaxa.

References

1975 births
Living people
Brazilian footballers
Brazilian expatriate footballers
Guarani FC players
Santa Cruz Futebol Clube players
Liga MX players
Chiapas F.C. footballers
C.D. Veracruz footballers
Club Necaxa footballers
Expatriate footballers in Mexico
Association football midfielders
Sportspeople from Salvador, Bahia